Khajauli Assembly constituency is an assembly constituency in Madhubani district in the Indian state of Bihar. It is an open seat now but was earlier reserved for scheduled castes.

Overview
As per Delimitation of Parliamentary and Assembly constituencies Order, 2008, No. 33 Khajauli Assembly constituency is composed of the following: Jainagar and Basopatti community development blocks; Nararh East, Mahua Ekdara, Datwar, Sarabe, Rasidpur, Betakakarghati and Khajauli gram panchayats of Khajauli CD Block.

Khajauli Assembly constituency is part of No. 7 Jhanjharpur (Lok Sabha constituency).

Members of Legislative Assembly

Election results

2020

References

External links
 

Assembly constituencies of Bihar
Politics of Madhubani district